Johari Cabinet is the name of either of two cabinets of Sarawak:
Abang Johari Cabinet I (2017–2021)
Abang Johari Cabinet II (2021–present)